Triskaidekaphobia is fear or avoidance of the number . It is also a reason for the fear of Friday the 13th, called paraskevidekatriaphobia or friggatriskaidekaphobia.

The term was used as early as in 1910 by Isador Coriat in Abnormal Psychology.

Origins

The supposed unlucky nature of the number 13 has several theories of origin. Although several authors claim it is an older belief, no such evidence has been documented so far. In fact, the earliest attestation of 13 being unlucky is first found after the Middle Ages in Europe.

Playing cards

Tarot card games have been attested since at least around 1450 with the Visconti-Sforza Tarot. One of the trump cards in tarot represents death and is the card number 13 in several variants.

In 1781, Antoine Court de Gébelin writes this in a French book involving Tarot of Marseilles:
Le no. XIII. représente la Mort [...] Il n'est pas étonnant qu'elle soit placée sous ce numéro; le nombre treize fut toujours regarde comme malheureux.
Number XIII represents Death [...] It is not astonishing that it is placed under this number; the number thirteen was always looked upon as unlucky.

In 1784, Johann Gottlob Immanuel Breitkopf writes a German book on the origins of playing cards, cites Gébelin, and reaffirms that the tarot card number 13 is death and misfortune ("Der Tod, Unglück").

13 at a table

Since at least 1774, the "13 at a table"-superstition has been documented: if 13 people sit at a table, then one of those must die that year. The origin of the superstition is unclear and various ideas have been presented over the years.

In 1774, Johann August Ephraim Götze speculates:

Da ich aus der Erfahrung weis, daß der Aberglaube nichts liebers, als Religionssachen, zu seinen Beweisen macht; so glaube ich bey nahe nicht zu irren, wenn ich den Ursprung des Gegenwärtigen mit der Zahl XIII, von der Stelle des Evangelii herleite, wo der Heiland, bey der Ostermahlzeit, mit zwölf Jüngern zu Tische saß.
Since I know from experience that superstition loves nothing better than religious matters as its proofs, I believe I'm almost not mistaken when I derive the origin of the present with the number XIII from the passage of the Gospel where the Savior sat at table with twelve disciples at the Easter meal.

From the 1890s, a number of English language sources resurface the idea that at the Last Supper, Judas, the disciple who betrayed Jesus, was the 13th to sit at the table. The Bible says nothing about the order in which the Apostles sat, but there were thirteen people at the table.

In 1968, Douglas Hill in Magic and Superstitions recounts a Norse myth about 12 gods having a dinner party in Valhalla. The trickster god Loki, who was not invited, arrived as the 13th guest, and arranged for Höðr to shoot Balder with a mistletoe-tipped arrow. This story was also echoed in Holiday folklore, phobias, and fun by folklore historian Donald Dossey, citing Hill. However, in Prose Edda by Snorri Sturluson, the story about Loki and Balder does not emphasize that there are 12 gods, nor does it talk about a dinner party or the number 13.

Events related to "unlucky" 13

 On Friday, October 13, 1307, the arrest of the Knights Templar was ordered by Philip IV of France. While the number 13 was considered unlucky, Friday the 13th was not considered unlucky at the time. The incorrect idea that their arrest was related to the phobias surrounding Friday the 13th was invented early in the 21st century and popularized by the novel The Da Vinci Code.
 In 1881 an influential group of New Yorkers, led by US Civil War veteran Captain William Fowler, came together to put an end to this and other superstitions. They formed a dinner cabaret club, which they called the Thirteen Club. At the first meeting, on January 13, 1881, at 8:13 p.m., thirteen people sat down to dine in Room 13 of the venue. The guests walked under a ladder to enter the room and were seated among piles of spilled salt. Many "Thirteen Clubs" sprang up all over North America over the next 45 years. Their activities were regularly reported in leading newspapers, and their numbers included five future US presidents, from Chester A. Arthur to Theodore Roosevelt. Thirteen Clubs had various imitators, but they all gradually faded due to a lack of interest.
 The British submarine, sank on 29 January 1917 while on her trials after diving with a hatch and some vents still open. Although she was raised and 48 men were rescued, 32 sailors and civilian technicians died. When repaired, she was renamed K22 but was later involved in a multiple series of collisions with other K-class submarines on 1 February 1918 in which a total of 103 men were killed, an event known as the Battle of May Island. In the subsequent British L-class submarine, the number L13 was not used.
 Apollo 13 was launched on April 11, 1970, at 13:13:00 CST and suffered an oxygen tank explosion on April 13 at 21:07:53 CST. It returned safely to Earth on April 17.
 Friday the 13th mini-crash was a stock market crash that occurred on Friday, October 13, 1989.
 Vehicle registration plates in Ireland are such that the first two digits represent the year of registration of the vehicle (i.e., 11 is a 2011 registered car, 12 is 2012, and so on). In 2012, there were concerns among members of the Society of the Irish Motor Industry (SIMI) that the prospect of having "13" registered vehicles might discourage motorists from buying new cars because of superstition surrounding the number thirteen, and that car sales and the motor industry (which was already doing badly) would suffer as a result. The government, in consultation with SIMI, introduced a system whereby 2013 registered vehicles would have their registration plates' age identifier string modified to read "131" for vehicles registered in the first six months of 2013 and "132" for those registered in the latter six months of the year.

Effect on US Shuttle program mission naming

The disaster that occurred on Apollo 13 may have been a factor that led to a renaming that prevented a mission called STS-13. STS-41-G was the name of the thirteenth Space Shuttle flight. However, originally STS-41-C was the mission originally numbered STS-13 STS-41-C was the eleventh orbital flight of the space shuttle program.

The numbering system of the Space Shuttle was changed to a new one after STS-9. The new naming scheme started with STS-41B, the previous mission was STS-9, and the thirteenth mission (what would have been STS-13) would be STS-41C. The new scheme had first number stand for the U.S. fiscal year, the next number was a launch site (1 or 2), and the next was the number of the mission numbered with a letter for that period.

In the case of the actual 13th flight, the crew was apparently not superstitious and made a humorous mission patch that had a black cat on it. Also, that mission re-entered and landed on Friday the 13th which one crew described as being "pretty cool". Because of the way the designations and launch manifest work, the mission numbered STS-13 might not have actually been the 13th to launch as was common throughout the shuttle program; indeed it turned out to be the eleventh. One of the reasons for this was when a launch had to be scrubbed, which delayed its mission.

NASA said in a 2016 news article it was due to a much higher frequency of planned launches (pre-Challenger disaster). As it was, the Shuttle program did have a disaster on its one-hundred and thirteenth mission going by date of launch, which was STS-107. The actual mission STS-113 was successful, and had actually launched earlier due to the nature of the launch manifest.

Omission of 13th rooms, floors and decks

Many ships, including cruise liners have omitted having a 13th deck due to triskaidekaphobia. Instead, the decks are numbered up to 12 and skip straight to number 14. Hotels, buildings and elevator manufacturers have also avoided using the number 13 for rooms and floors based on triskaidekaphobia.

Famous people with triskaidekaphobia

 Arnold Schoenberg
 Franklin D. Roosevelt
 Sholom Aleichem
 Stephen King
 Nick Yarris
 Ángel Nieto

Similar phobias

 Number 4 (Tetraphobia). In China, Taiwan, Singapore, Japan, Korea, and Vietnam, as well as in some other East Asian and South East Asian countries, it is not uncommon for buildings (including offices, apartments, hotels) to omit floors with numbers that include the digit 4, and Finnish mobile phone manufacturer Nokia's 1xxx-9xxx series of mobile phones does not include any model numbers beginning with a 4 (except Series 40, Nokia 3410 and Nokia 4.2). This originates from Classical Chinese, in which the pronunciation of the word for "four" (四, sì in Mandarin) is very similar to that of the word for "death" (死, sǐ in Mandarin), and remains so in the other countries' Sino-Xenic vocabulary (Korean sa for both; Japanese shi for both; Vietnamese tứ "four" vs. tử "death").
 Friday the 13th (Paraskevidekatriaphobia or Friggatriskaidekaphobia) is considered to be a day of bad luck in a number of western cultures. In Greece and some areas of Latin America, Tuesday the 13th is similarly considered unlucky.
 Number 17 (Heptadecaphobia). In Italy, perhaps because in Roman numerals 17 is written XVII, which can be rearranged to VIXI, which in Latin means "I have lived" but can be a euphemism for "I am dead." In Italy, some planes have no row 17 and some hotels have no room 17.
 Number 39 (Triakontenneaphobia). There is a belief in some parts of Afghanistan that the number 39 (thrice thirteen) is cursed or a badge of shame.
 Number 616 (Hexakosioihekkaidekaphobia) or 666 (Hexakosioihexekontahexaphobia), which come from the Biblical number of the beast.

Lucky 13
In some regions, 13 is or has been considered a lucky number. For example, prior to the First World War, 13 was considered to be a lucky number in France, even being featured on postcards and charms. In more modern times, 13 is lucky in Italy except in some contexts, such as sitting at the dinner table. In Cantonese-speaking areas, including Hong Kong and Macau, the number 13 is considered lucky because it sounds similar to the Cantonese words meaning "sure to live" (as opposed to the unlucky number 14 which in Cantonese sounds like the words meaning "sure to die"). Colgate University was started by 13 men with $13 and 13 prayers, so 13 is considered a lucky number. Friday the 13th is the luckiest day at Colgate.

A number of sportspeople are known for wearing the number 13 jersey and performing successfully. On November 23, 2003, the Miami Dolphins retired the number 13 for Dan Marino, who played quarterback for the Dolphins from 1983 to 1999. Kurt Warner, St. Louis Rams quarterback (NFL MVP, 1999 & 2001, and Super Bowl XXXIV MVP) also wore number 13. Wilt Chamberlain, 13-time NBA All-Star, has had his No. 13 Jersey retired by the NBA's Golden State Warriors, Philadelphia 76ers; Los Angeles Lakers, Harlem Globetrotters, and Kansas University Jayhawks, all of which he played for. In 1966, the Portugal national football team achieved their best-ever result at the World Cup final tournaments by finishing third, thanks to a Mozambican-born striker, Eusebio, who has scored nine goals at World Cup – four of them in a 5-3 quarterfinal win over North Korea – and won the Golden Boot award as the tournament's top scorer while wearing the number 13. In the 1954 and 1974 World Cup finals, Germany's Max Morlock and Gerd Müller, respectively, played and scored in the final, wearing the number 13. More recent footballers playing successfully despite wearing number 13, include Michael Ballack, Alessandro Nesta, and Rafinha. Among other sportspeople who have chosen 13 as their number, are Venezuelans Dave Concepción, Omar Vizquel, Oswaldo Guillén and Pastor Maldonado due to the number being considered lucky in Venezuelan culture. Swedish-born hockey player Mats Sundin, who played 14 of his 18 NHL seasons for the Toronto Maple Leafs, setting team records for goals and points, had his number 13 retired by the team on 15 October 2016.

See also
 List of phobias, including Numerophobia
National Accident Day (Finland)

Notes
 The main reason for this was stated to be to increase the number of car sales in the second half of the year. Even though 70% of new cars are bought during the first four months of the year, some consumers believe that the calendar year of registration does not accurately reflect the real age of a new car, since cars bought in January will most likely have been manufactured the previous year, while those bought later in the year will be actually made in the same year.
 Tuesday is generally unlucky in Greece for the fall of Byzantium Tues 29th May 1453. In Spanish-speaking countries, there is a proverb: En martes no te cases, ni te embarques 'On Tuesday, do not get married or set sail'.

References

External links

 'Unlucky' airline logo grounded BBC, 21 February 2007
 Would you buy a number 13 house? BBC Magazine, Friday, 12 December 2008
 Triskaidekaphobia on MathWorld
 Who's Afraid Of Friday The 13th? on NPR

 
Norse mythology
Superstitions about numbers